Saperda bacillicornis is a species of beetle in the family Cerambycidae. It was described by Pesarini and Sabbadini in 1997. It is known from China.

References

bacillicornis
Beetles described in 1997